The 1947 Tuskegee Golden Tigers football team was an American football team that represented Tuskegee University as a member of the Southern Intercollegiate Athletic Conference (SIAC) during the 1947 college football season. In their 25th season under head coach Cleveland Abbott, Tuskegee compiled a 6–4–1 record (3–2–1 against conference opponents) and outscored all opponents by a total of 174 to 116. The team played its home games at the Alumni Bowl in Tuskegee, Alabama.

Schedule

References

Tuskegee
Tuskegee Golden Tigers football seasons
Tuskegee Golden Tigers football